Opharus immanis is a moth of the family Erebidae. It was described by Henry Edwards in 1884. It is found in Mexico, Panama and Venezuela.

References

Opharus
Moths described in 1884
Moths of North America
Moths of South America